This is a list of towns and villages in County Waterford, Ireland.

A
 Affane
 Aglish
 Annestown
 Ardmore

B
Ballinamult
Ballinroad
Ballylaneen
Ballymacarbry
Ballytruckle
Bunmahon

C
Cappoquin
Carrickbeg
Cheekpoint
Clashmore
Clonea

D
Dungarvan
Dunhill
Dunmore East

F
Fenor

G
Glencairn
Grange

K
Kill
Kilmacthomas
Kilmanahan
Kilmeaden
Kilrossanty
Kinsalebeg
Knockanore

L
Lemybrien
Lisduggan
Lismore

M
Mahon Bridge
Mothel
Mountmellaray

N
Newtown

O
Old Parish

P
Passage East
Portlaw

R
Rathgormack

S
Stradbally

T
Tallow
Tooraneena
Tramore

V
Villierstown

W
Waterford

References

 
Towns and villages